"Scream" is a song by Billy Idol from his 2005 studio album Devil's Playground. It was first released as the album's lead single (in 2005 on Sanctuary Records).

Background and writing 
The song was written by Billy Idol and Brian Tichy.

Appearances 
The song was used in an episode of Viva La Bam, in which Idol also guest starred, where he and Bam Margera sing it as they go down the highway.

Critical response 
The Billboard magazine noted that Idol wasn't quite successful "aping Nirvana's soft verse/howling chorus" on the song.

Charts

References

External links 
 "Scream" at Discogs

2005 songs
2005 singles
Songs written by Billy Idol

Billy Idol songs
Song recordings produced by Keith Forsey
Festival Records singles
Sanctuary Records singles